KRXA (540 AM) is a radio station broadcasting a Spanish language Catholic radio format.  Licensed to Carmel Valley, California, the station serves the Salinas - Monterey - Santa Cruz areas of Central California. It is owned by El Sembrador Ministries and broadcasts its Spanish-language ESNE Radio Catholic radio network.

By day, KRXA is powered at 10,000 watts.  But because 540 AM is a Mexican and Canadian clear channel frequency, KRXA must greatly reduce power at sunset to 500 watts to avoid interference.  The transmitter is on Old Stage Road in Salinas.  It uses a three-tower array directional antenna.

History
On July 19, 1987, the station signed on the air.  Its original call sign before it went on the air, as a construction permit, was KJCC.

In 1995, after being purchased by Cypress Communications, KIEZ switched from a Spanish language KKLF simulcast to its own adult standards format. From 2005 to 2012, the station had a progressive talk format.

When KRXA was sold to El Sembrador, the progressive talk moved to RadioMonterey.com.  With the sale, KRXA switched to a Spanish language Catholic radio format.

References

External links

Radio stations established in 1989
Talk radio stations in the United States
1989 establishments in California
RXA